Harlem station may refer to:

Harlem, Manhattan 
Harlem–125th Street station
125th Street (IRT Lexington Avenue Line)
Harlem–148th Street (IRT Lenox Avenue Line)

Chicago 
Harlem station (CTA Blue Line O'Hare branch)
Harlem station (CTA Blue Line Congress branch)
Harlem/Lake station

See also 
Harlem (disambiguation)